Jimtown High School is located in Elkhart, Indiana, United States. It is in Baugo Township, and a part of the Baugo Community Schools system.

Athletics
The Jimtown football team has won four state titles (1991-1992, 1997-1998, 1998-1999, and 2005-2006). Jimtown has been arch-rivals with Concord High School since the program started in 1955, and the series is (as of 2008) tied 24-24. The Jimmies play at Knepp Field.  The Jimtown basketball team won the 2A state championship in 2003-2004.

See also
 List of high schools in Indiana

References

External links
 Jimtown High School
 Indiana Department of Education: Jimtown High School

Public high schools in Indiana
Schools in Elkhart County, Indiana